The Port of Natal is in Natal, Rio Grande do Norte, Brazil, on the Potengi River. It is the South American port closest to Europe. Inaugurated on January 14, 1922, the port is administered by CODERN (Companhia Docas do Rio Grande do Norte), and today has a strong focus on the export of fruit.

References

External links
  Official website

Ports and harbours of Brazil
Buildings and structures in Rio Grande do Norte
Transport in Rio Grande do Norte